Juan Gualberto Gómez Airport , formerly known as Varadero Airport, is an international airport serving Varadero, Cuba and the province of Matanzas. The airport is located 5 km from the village of Carbonera, closer to the city of Matanzas than to Varadero. The closest airport to Varadero is Kawama Airport. In 2009, the airport handled 1.28 million passengers, making it the second busiest airport in Cuba after José Martí International Airport in Havana.

History
Juan Gualberto Gomez Airport was built in 1989 and inaugurated by Fidel Castro, thus replacing the old Varadero airport located in Santa Marta, currently known as Kawama Airport. The airport was named after a journalist, fighter for the Cuban Independence and black rights activist in Cuba Juan Gualberto Gómez (1854–1933).

The terminal building has shops for tourists (including rum, cigars, T-shirts, books, carvings, pharmaceuticals) both before customs check point, at a large departures lounge with cafeterias on the upper level and a smaller air conditioned VIP lounge the lower level.

Immigration checkpoint consists of wooden booths for push doors opened by immigration officers after travelers have been processed. Customs check point consists of three x-ray machines. Two flights of stairs and an escalator take travelers to the departure lounge.
Tour operators offices are located near the domestic terminal area.

The ground handling equipment is imported mainly from North America. There are four jet bridges (serving parking areas 2 to 5), but air stairs are used for the remaining aircraft parking space #1 on the apron by the terminal.

Airlines and destinations

In April 2020, Cuba stopped all scheduled flights. In October 2020, it was announced that the airport would be reopening for flights with tourists being restricted to a "bubble" but before that began, the province moved to the "new normality" and the airport reopened for regular commercial flights, with flights from Mexico and the UK.

Accidents and incidents
There have been five significant incidents involving aircraft from or en route to the airport since the 1950s. Only 1 flight involved resulted in fatalities. Three flights involved Cubans hijacking an aircraft to flee to the United States.

 6 March 2005 - Air Transat Flight 961 Airbus A310 returned safely to airport following detachment of rudder after takeoff.
 29 December 1992 - Aerocaribbean Antonov 26 was hijacked en route to Varadero Airport from Havana. The aircraft landed in Miami.

Accidents and incidents that occurred at Varadero (Santa Marta) Airport (now as Kawama Airport):
 3 July 1961 - Cubana de Aviación Douglas DC-3 was hijacked en route to Varadero Airport from Havana. Aircraft lands in Miami.
 25 April 1959 - Cubana de Aviación Vickers Viscount was hijacked after takeoff from the Varadero Airport and forced to land at Key West International Airport.
 1 November 1958 - Cubana de Aviación Flight 495 Vickers Viscount 755D crashes in Nipe Bay when attempting an emergency landing at the airport, which was then known as Preston Airport. The plane was en route to Varadero from Miami with 20 on board. Only 3 survived with 17 fatalities.

References

External links 

Cubana destinations and airports

Airports in Cuba
Cárdenas, Cuba
Matanzas
Buildings and structures in Matanzas Province